Xitieying station is a subway station on Line 14 of the Beijing Subway. The station opened on December 31, 2021.

Platform Layout
The station has an underground island platform.

On the station hall floor of this station, there is a mural "Elegant Interest in Xiying" designed by Xiang Yu, a graduate student of the Sculpture Department of the Central Academy of Fine Arts. Through the use of traditional Chinese cultural elements such as classical furniture and Penjing, it reproduces the peaceful and elegant life of the ancient Beijing literati.

Exits
There are 2 exits, lettered C and D. Exit C is accessible via an elevator.

References

Beijing Subway stations in Fengtai District
Railway stations in China opened in 2021